Koushani Mukherjee is an Indian actress-turned to politician. She mainly appears in Bengali films. She debuted in the movie Parbona Ami Chartey Tokey in 2015, with Bonny Sengupta, directed by Raj Chakraborty.

Career
In 2015, Mukherjee won Miss Beauty of Kolkata.

Mukherjee began her film career in 2015 with Raj Chakraborty's movie Parbona Ami Chartey Tokey. Mukherjee plays Aparna, a romantic interest in the movie. In 2016, she appeared in Kelor Kirti, a romantic comedy directed by Raja Chanda. In Kelor Kirti, she plays a wealthy young woman, Anuskha, who falls in love with a journalist. In 2017, she was cast in a new release by Ravi Kinnagi. In the year 2019 she was signed as the cover for FFACE Fashion Calendar.

Filmography

References

External links
 
 

Living people
Year of birth missing (living people)
21st-century Indian actresses
Actresses in Bengali cinema
Indian film actresses